"Lie Lie Lie" is a song by American singer Joshua Bassett. It was released on January 14, 2021, by Warner Records, as the lead single from his eponymous debut EP. Bassett wrote the song, with production from Afterhrs. The official music video for "Lie Lie Lie" was released to YouTube on January 15.

Background and release 
Bassett starred in the 2019 Disney+ mockumentary series, High School Musical: The Musical: The Series. He shared a clip of a song called "I Know" on Instagram the day preceding its premiere. He co-wrote a song called "Just for a Moment" for the soundtrack. The series was renewed for a second season in 2021. Bassett signed to Warner Records, and released the singles "Common Sense" and "Anyone Else" in 2020. He was the sole writer on the former.

On January 4, 2021, Bassett announced that "I Know" (now titled "Lie Lie Lie") would be released 10 days later. It was released to digital music and streaming platforms on January 14, followed by its music video the next day. It serves as the lead single from Bassett's eponymous debut EP (2021).

Composition 

Bassett dismisses a two-faced friend on the lyrics of "Lie Lie Lie", which include: "So you can lie, lie, lie, lie, lie / Go ahead and try, try, try, try, try / It won't work this time, time, time, time, time / I kiss your ass goodbye, bye, bye, bye, bye".

Music video
The music video for "Lie Lie Lie" was released on January 15, 2021. Seventeens Tamara Fuentes pointed out several similarities between the video and Bassett's High School Musical: The Musical: The Series co-star Olivia Rodrigo's music video for "Drivers License" (2021).

Credits and personnel
Credits adapted from Tidal.

 Joshua Bassett – lead vocals, songwriting, guitar
 Afterhrs – production
 Andrew Haas – background vocals, bass, guitar, keyboards, programming, record engineering
 Ian Franzino – background vocals, keyboards, programming, record engineering
 Dale Becker – masterer
 Mark Stent – mixer

Charts

Release history

References

2021 singles
2021 songs
Joshua Bassett songs
American pop rock songs
Songs written by Joshua Bassett
Warner Records singles